Forrer's grass frog or Forrer's leopard frog (Lithobates forreri) is a species of frog in the family Ranidae found in Mexico and Central America through Guatemala, El Salvador, Honduras, and Nicaragua to Costa Rica. It is a widespread and common frog found in lowland and seasonal tropical forests. It can also adapt to man-made habitats such as flooded agricultural lands and other water content systems. Reproduction requires permanent pools and lagoons.

References

Lithobates
Amphibians described in 1883
Amphibians of Costa Rica
Amphibians of El Salvador
Amphibians of Guatemala
Amphibians of Honduras
Amphibians of Mexico
Amphibians of Nicaragua
Taxonomy articles created by Polbot